Jesse Tyler Ferguson (born October 22, 1975) is an American actor. From 2009 to 2020, he portrayed Mitchell Pritchett on the sitcom Modern Family, for which he earned five consecutive nominations for the Primetime Emmy Award for Outstanding Supporting Actor in a Comedy Series.

Ferguson made his Broadway debut in On the Town, and was in the original Broadway cast of The 25th Annual Putnam County Spelling Bee, for which he and his ensemble cast won a Drama Desk Award for Outstanding Cast Ensemble. He has appeared in theatre adaptations of A Winter's Tale, The Producers, A Midsummer Night's Dream, Spamalot and The Merchant of Venice. For his performance in the 2016 Broadway production of Fully Committed, Ferguson was awarded a Drama Desk Award for Outstanding Solo Performance. He won the Tony Award for Best Featured Actor in a Play for his performance in the 2022 Broadway revival of Richard Greenberg's Take Me Out.

Early years
Jesse Tyler Ferguson was born in Missoula, Montana, to Anne Ferguson (née Doyle) and Robert "Bob" Ferguson. His parents divorced when he was 18 years old. Ferguson has a brother, Ben Ferguson, and sister, Kelly Ferguson. Ferguson was named after his paternal grandmother, Jessie Uppercue Ferguson, to whom he was very close growing up. His paternal great-grandfather was also named Jesse.

His family moved when he was young to Albuquerque, New Mexico, where he was raised. At age eight he decided to become an actor, and joined the Albuquerque Children's Theater, where he was a member for six years. At Albuquerque's St. Pius X High School, Ferguson played Albert Peterson in Bye Bye Birdie and General Bullmoose in Li'l Abner. He participated on the speech and debate team and graduated in 1994. He worked as a dancer/singer at Cliff's Amusement Park.

After high school Ferguson attended The American Musical and Dramatic Academy (AMDA) in New York City.

Career

Theater

In New York City, Ferguson worked mainly in Off-Broadway and Broadway theatre, including the Tony Award-winning The 25th Annual Putnam County Spelling Bee, where he originated the role of Leaf Coneybear. Ferguson starred in the Public Theater's 2007 Shakespeare in the Park production of A Midsummer Night's Dream and 2015 production of The Tempest. In the summer of 2015, he played Sir Robin in the Hollywood Bowl production of Monty Python's Spamalot.

In March 2012, Ferguson was featured as Dr. Ilan Meyer in a performance of Dustin Lance Black's play 8, a staged reenactment of Perry v. Brown, the federal trial that overturned California's Proposition 8 ban on same-sex marriage. The production was held at the Wilshire Ebell Theatre and broadcast on YouTube to raise money for the American Foundation for Equal Rights, a non-profit organization funding the plaintiffs' legal team and sponsoring the play.

Television and film
On television, Ferguson was among the large ensemble cast on the short-lived CBS sitcom The Class, playing Richie Velch. Ferguson co-starred in the 2008 thriller Untraceable.

From 2009 to 2020, he has played the role of Mitchell Pritchett, the openly gay lawyer on the ABC sitcom Modern Family. For his performance, Ferguson has received five consecutive Emmy Award nominations for Outstanding Supporting Actor in a Comedy Series. He has also appeared as a judge on So You Think You Can Dance, and opposed actress Chrissy Metz in a 2017 episode of TBS's Drop the Mic. From 2020, he has co-hosted HGTV's Extreme Makeover: Home Edition together with Ty Pennington.

Other works
In 2018, Ferguson was one of the actors who voiced the audiobook A Day in the Life of Marlon Bundo.

In 2019, Ferguson appeared in Taylor Swift's music video for "You Need to Calm Down".

Philanthropy

In September 2012, Ferguson and his lawyer husband, Justin Mikita, started the non-profit charity Tie The Knot, an effort to raise funds in support of same-sex marriage, using bow ties sold to retail. They officially launched it as their engagement announcement in an online video where they explain only seven states at the time had same-sex marriage. In an interview Ferguson stated that he wanted to do something that was smaller and manageable in case it did not work out as a business model.

The foundation sells limited-edition bow ties to support organizations that advocate for same-sex marriage. Their collections are designed by the couple plus guest designers, and is sold by The Tie Bar, a Naperville, Illinois-based online men's neckwear company.

In January 2013, the couple were recruited by Lieutenant Governor of Illinois Sheila Simon to lobby legislators to pass SB10 which would allow same-sex marriage. The bill passed both legislative houses, and Governor Pat Quinn signed the bill into law, going into effect on June 1, 2014.

In October 2013, the American Civil Liberties Union named Ferguson the celebrity ambassador for the LGBT community. He participated heavily in the ACLU's "Out for Freedom" campaign They noted that Ferguson travelled to New Mexico, his home state, to take part in same sex marriage efforts. Before the state's full legalization of same-sex marriage on December 19, 2013, New Mexico did not explicitly permit or prohibit same-sex marriage; it was the only state lacking a statute or constitutional provision explicitly addressing same-sex marriage. The couple's non-profit made a grant of US$10,000 to the ACLU of New Mexico for same sex efforts.

In November 2013, a pop-up retail store for 'Tie The Knot' was located at the Los Angeles Beverly Center featuring the fourth collection from the couple, including professional athlete designs with Scott Fujita and Chris Kluwe, and Brittney Griner.

Personal life
Ferguson uses his full name as there was already an actor called Jesse Ferguson in the actors' union when he joined.

In September 2012, he announced his engagement to lawyer Justin Mikita, his boyfriend of nearly two years. They married in Manhattan on July 20, 2013, with the playwright and screenwriter Tony Kushner officiating at their wedding. The couple have two children, Beckett Mercer Ferguson-Mikita born on July 7, 2020  and Sullivan Louis Ferguson-Mikita born on November 15, 2022.

On the process of coming out, he said he had to tell his father three times (when he was 17, 19 and 21): "It's a coming out process for them as well, and it takes time".

He has a dog named Leaf. He is a supporter of the Democratic Party and is shown in the 2016 Democratic National Convention promotional trailer "Our Fight Song".

In August 2022, Ferguson officiated his Modern Family co-star Sarah Hyland's wedding with TV personality Wells Adams. The marriage ceremony took place at the Californian Sunstone Winery in Santa Ynez, California.

Filmography

Film

Television

Theatre

Music videos

Awards and nominations

References

External links

 
 
 
 

1975 births
20th-century American male actors
21st-century American male actors
Male actors from Montana
American male film actors
American male Shakespearean actors
American male stage actors
American male television actors
Drama Desk Award winners
American gay actors
LGBT people from Montana
Living people
People from Missoula, Montana
American LGBT rights activists
LGBT people from New Mexico
American Musical and Dramatic Academy alumni
Tony Award winners